Burges James Gadsden Provincial Park is a provincial park in British Columbia, Canada, south of the confluence of the Blaeberry and Columbia Rivers, northwest of Golden.

References

External links

Provincial parks of British Columbia
Columbia Country
1965 establishments in British Columbia